Tom Haberecht (born ) is an Australian former professional rugby league footballer who played in the 2000s.

Background
Haberecht was born in Sydney, New South Wales, Australia.

Career
Due to quota restrictions, he was released from his Castleford contract on 12 June 2008, following the signing of Mitchell Sargent.

References

External links
Castleford sign Aussie Haberecht
Tigers are stronger - Matterson
Knights sign forward Haberecht
Battling Knights lose to Widnes
Knights overwhelm 12-man Hunslet
Knights look to move into second

1985 births
Living people
Australian rugby league players
Castleford Tigers players
Rugby league centres
Rugby league players from Sydney
Rugby league second-rows
York City Knights players